Events in the year 1848 in Spain.

Incumbents
Monarch: Isabella II

Events

Births

Deaths
July 9 - Jaime Balmes, priest and philosopher

 
1840s in Spain